Chelemys megalonyx, also known as the large long-clawed mouse or large long-clawed akodont is a species of rodent in the genus Chelemys of family Cricetidae. It is endemic to central Chile.

References

Literature cited
D'Elia, G. and Patterson, B. 2008. . In IUCN. IUCN Red List of Threatened Species. Version 2009.2. <www.iucnredlist.org>. Downloaded on January 12, 2010.

Mammals of Chile
Chelemys
Mammals described in 1845
Taxonomy articles created by Polbot
Endemic fauna of Chile